Richard Parfitt is a musician and academic from Newport in south Wales, most publicly notable for his role as a founding member of 90's rock band The 60ft. Dolls. He had previously played in local mod band The Colours, who were renowned for busking on the streets of Newport.  The Colours only released the one single, The Dance, on the Loco label before he left to join The Truth in 1984, playing bass on their Five Live ep which was recorded at the 100 Club as well as their 1985 album Playground.

After having several UK Top 40 hits during the 90's, along with moderate success in the US, The 60 ft. Dolls split and Parfitt began working as a professional songwriter and session musician, going on to be credited by Welsh singer Duffy of discovering her talents and 'changing her life'. Parfitt helped write several songs for the artist's debut studio album Rockferry - which had considerable commercial success around the world, reaching UK No. 1 and becoming one of the ten best-selling albums in the world in 2008 – including the title song from the film How To Lose Friends and Alienate People, 'Enough Love'.

Parfitt also worked as a session guitarist on British artist Dido's second studio album, Life For Rent.

He has since written articles and papers in various musical contexts, taught as a lecturer, and directed the world's first songwriting degree programme, the MMus in Songwriting, at Bath Spa University in Bath, England.

Footnotes

Living people
Year of birth missing (living people)
People from Newport, Wales
Welsh scholars and academics
Welsh rock musicians